Daedalus is an ichnogenus, describing burrows with the shape of a garlic clove.

References

Burrow fossils